"Sunshine" is a country folk song from 1971 by Jonathan Edwards, released as the first single from his debut album Jonathan Edwards. The single reached #4 on the Billboard Hot 100 chart on January 15, 1972, and earned a gold record.

"Sunshine" was not originally planned for release, but when an engineer accidentally erased the master of a track called "Please Find Me" near the end of sessions for the album, "Sunshine" was used to fill the hole.

The song was released as a single and first gained popularity on Boston radio, before going nationwide.  Regarding its success, Edwards stated, "It was just at the time of the Vietnam War and Nixon. It was looking bad out there. That song meant a lot to a lot of people during that time--especially me."

"Sunshine" bears some melodic resemblance to the traditional country blues song "Green Rocky Road", popularized in the 1960s by folk singers Len Chandler and Dave van Ronk.

Chart history

Weekly charts

Year-end charts

Jonathan Edwards recorded and released a bluegrass version of "Sunshine" (along with an entire album) with the band "The Seldom Scene."

Covers
In 1980, Juice Newton scored a Top-40 hit, peaking at #35 on the Billboard Country chart, with her version of "Sunshine".

Paul Westerberg's cover is featured on the Friends soundtrack.

The Isley Brothers also cut a version of this song for 3 + 3.

The song is featured in the 2004 film Anchorman: The Legend of Ron Burgundy and is also included on the film's soundtrack.

"Sunshine" was featured in the seventh episode of Aaron Sorkin's The Newsroom, "5/1" where Will MacAvoy and Jim Harper perform it together at Will's party for the staff.

In July 2007, the original Jonathan Edwards recording joined the list of Vietnam Era protest songs used to sell high-end consumer products when it was used as the only audio in a Jeep television spot, part of the Heritage campaign developed by the Cutwater agency.

Izzy Stradlin, formerly of Guns N' Roses, recorded an acoustic version in the summer of 2016.

See also
List of anti-war songs

References

External links 

 Jonathan Edwards Official Site

1971 singles
1980 singles
Protest songs
The Isley Brothers songs
Juice Newton songs
1971 songs
Capricorn Records singles
Anti-war songs